Sällskapsresan eller Finns det svenskt kaffe på grisfesten? is a Swedish comedy film which was released to cinemas in Sweden on 22 August 1980, and the first in a franchise directed by Lasse Åberg. The film has reached cult status in Sweden and a vast number of the Swedish people have seen it, and many of the lines in the movie are known and referenced frequently by many Swedes. It was entered into the 12th Moscow International Film Festival.

Plot
The plot follows an old-fashioned, nerdy Swede, Stig-Helmer Olsson (Lasse Åberg), who travels to the fictional town of Nueva Estocolmo in Gran Canaria. Before the trip, he meets with a psychiatrist, Dr. B. A:son Levander (Magnus Härenstam), for treatment of his fear of flying. Levander then cons him into smuggling money for another tourist, Gösta Angerud (Roland Janson), by asking Stig-Helmer to deliver a Christmas present to Levander's aunt in Nueva Estocolmo. At the airport in Sweden, Stig-Helmer meets and befriends a man from Norway, Ole Bramserud (Jon Skolmen). Among the other tourists are Angerud, the single sisters Maj-Britt (Lottie Ejebrant) and Siv (Kim Anderzon), the heavy drinkers Berra (Sven Melander) and Robban (Weiron Holmberg), who throughout the movie search for a liquor store named Pepe's Bodega; and the newlywed and camera-enthusiastic Storch couple.

Cast 
Lasse Åberg – Stig-Helmer Olsson
Jon Skolmen – Ole Bramserud
Lottie Ejebrant – Maj-Britt Lindberg
Kim Anderzon – Siv Åman
Ted Åström – Lasse Lundberg
Weiron Holmberg – Robban Söderberg
Sven Melander – Berra Ohlsson
Svante Grundberg – Herr Storch
Eva Örn – Fru Storch
Roland Janson – Gösta Angerud
Magnus Härenstam – Dr B. A:son Levander
Gösta Ekman (uncredited) – Hotel Maid

Reception
The film has become a classic in Sweden, though it was not well received by Swedish critics at the time of release. Jan Aghed from Sydsvenska Dagbladet wrote "There are many funny gags in the beginning, and the film is very funny until the travellers have reached their destination. The film then goes on very slowly in poor humor and boredom." The film became a box-office success with over 2 million people watching the film, making it the most watched Swedish cinema-film in Sweden as of 2023.

The success of the film spawned a series of films about the character Stig-Helmer, mostly making fun of Swedish vacation activities:

1985 Sällskapsresan 2 - Snowroller (skiing)
1988 S.O.S. - En segelsällskapsresa (sailing)
1991 Den ofrivillige golfaren (golfing)
1999 Hälsoresan - En smal film av stor vikt (health spas)
2011 The Stig-Helmer Story (chronicles the life of young Stig-Helmer)

The film was adapted into a musical, also named Sällskapsresan, in 2015. Sven Melander reprised his role from 1980.

References

External links 

Swedish Christmas comedy films
1980 films
1980s Swedish-language films
Films set in Spain
Films set in Sweden
Films set in the Canary Islands
Films shot in the Canary Islands
1980 in Sweden
Films directed by Lasse Åberg
1980s Christmas comedy films
1980s Swedish films